The Billboard magazine publishes a weekly chart that ranks the best-selling albums in the United States. The chart nowadays known as the Billboard 200 was titled Best Selling Pop Albums in 1951. Starting with the issue dated July 22, 1950, Billboard decided to split the popular albums chart between the two common album formats at the time–33 1/3 rpm and 45 rpm, because the versions of the albums were often not released simultaneously and larger retailers had issues filling out Billboards questionnaire.

The cast recording of the 1949 musical South Pacific, composed by Richard Rodgers and mainly recorded by Ezio Pinza and Mary Martin, spent nineteen combined weeks on top between January and April. The most dominant individual artist in 1951 was Mario Lanza. Three albums recorded by Lanza topped the charts for thirty combined weeks. The first of which, the soundtrack to the 1950 film The Toast of New Orleans, in which Lanza starred in topped the 45 rpm chart for six weeks in February and March. The soundtrack to his follow-up film The Great Caruso reigned atop each of the charts for ten consecutive weeks. The album sold more than 100,000 copies before the film was released and became the first LP to sell more than one million copies in the US.
Finally, Lanza's christmas album Mario Lanza Sings Christmas Songs was number one for the final two weeks of the year on both charts. This made 1951 the first year since the charts inception in 1945, that Bing Crosby's Merry Christmas did not reach number one in December. Billboard did not issue a year-end chart for albums in 1951. The women's album that reigned at the top of the Billboard was The Voice of Xtabay of Yma Sumac in which he remained at the top for 6 weeks.

Chart history

Notes

References

See also
1951 in music
List of number-one albums (United States)

1951
Number-one albums of 1951 (U.S.)